Mount Rockwell is located in the Lewis Range, Glacier National Park in the U.S. state of Montana. Mount Rockwell is situated along the Continental Divide and Aurice Lake is just west of the peak.

See also
 Mountains and mountain ranges of Glacier National Park (U.S.)

References

Mountains of Flathead County, Montana
Mountains of Glacier County, Montana
Mountains of Glacier National Park (U.S.)
Lewis Range
Mountains of Montana